Antiviral may refer to:

Antiviral (film), a 2012 Canadian film
Antiviral drug, a class of medication used specifically for treating viral infections.
Antiviral protein
Antivirus software
Antiviral Therapy (journal), an academic journal